E.Kothapalli is a village & panchayat in Pulivendula mandal, Kadapa district, in the state of Andhra Pradesh in India.

Villages in Kadapa district